General José de San Martín is a department located in Salta Province, Argentina.

With an area of  it borders to the north with Bolivia , to the east with Rivadavia, and to the south and west with Orán.

Towns and municipalities
 Aguaray
 Campamento Vespucio
 Embarcación  
 General Ballivián
 General Mosconi
 Salvador Mazza
 Tartagal

References

External links 
 Departments of Salta Province website

Departments of Salta Province